Kopuzlu can refer to:

 Kopuzlu, Bismil
 Kopuzlu, Keban
 Kopuzlu, Posof